Best of Collide is a compilation album by Collide, released on October 24, 2013, by Noiseplus Music. It comprises tracks are drawn from the remix albums Vortex to Bent and Broken.

Track listing

Personnel
Adapted from the Best of Collide liner notes.

Collide
 Eric Anest (as Statik) – keyboards, sequencer
 Karin Johnston (as kaRIN) – vocals

Release history

References

External links 
 Best of Collide at Discogs (list of releases)

Collide (band) albums
2013 compilation albums